Firefighter arson is a persistent phenomenon involving a very small minority of firefighters who are also active arsonists. Fire-fighting organizations are aware of this problem. Some of the offenders seem to be motivated by boredom, or by the prospect of receiving attention for responding to the fires they have set.
It has been reported that roughly 100 U.S. firefighters are convicted of arson each year. 

Firefighter-caused arsons are not tracked in the United States. The National Interagency Fire Center (NIFC) and the National Fire Incident Reporting System (NFIRS) report arson-related fires, however no specific system for documenting and tracking firefighter-caused arsons is in place. Without complete information on the statistics of firefighter-caused arsons, these arsons are perceived as isolated incidents. While some states may be able to produce information on the number of firefighter arson prosecutions, other fire agencies do not even acknowledge that the problem exists.

Motives for a firefighter committing arson vary, ranging from the need for excitement or thrill to the wish to conceal a crime. An excitement-based motive would suggest that the firefighter wanted to be viewed as a hero. These fires are anything from "nuisance" fires, such as a trash container fire, to a fully occupied apartment fire. This motivation could be due to a need for excitement or thrill, but also in some rare cases sexual gratification. The firefighter would set the fire, allow it to be reported from an outside source before arriving on the scene, and acting as a hero. This can also be classified as hero syndrome. 

Firefighter arson is also one of the major reasons the term "hero syndrome" was coined and brought into popular discussion. Firefighters committing arson is commonly believed to be a form not only of hero syndrome but sometimes of other disorders and/or disabilities pertaining to the mind. These include but are not limited to borderline personality disorder, pyromania, and suicidal tendencies.

The FBI study found that the arson cases involving more than one firefighter frequently were associated with department programs designed for younger participants, such as those for apprentice firefighters, youth groups, or auxiliary firefighter programs for teenagers.

In the 1990s, the South Carolina Forestry Commission and the FBI Behavior Analysis Unit developed separate profiles of a firefighter-arsonist:

References 

Firefighters
Arson